The men's team tournament of the 2017 European Table Tennis Championships was held from 13 to 17 September 2017.

All times are local (UTC+1)

Medalists

Championship division
The top two teams of each group advanced.

Preliminary round

Group A

Group B

Group C

Group D

Knockout stage

Places 1–8

5th place bracket

Quarterfinals

5th-7th place

Semifinals

Final

5th place

7th place

Places 9–16

13th place bracket

Quarterfinals

13-15th place

Semifinals

9th place

11th place

13th place

15th place

Challenge Division

Preliminary round

Group E

Group F

Group G

Group H

Knockout stage

Places 17–24

21st place bracket

Quarterfinals

21-24th place

Semifinals

17th place

19th place

21st place

23rd place

Places 25–32

29th place bracket

Quarterfinals

29-32nd place

Semifinals

25th place

27th place

29th place

31st place

Standard Division

Preliminary round

Group I

Group J

Knockout stage

Places 33–36

37th place bracket

37-40th place

Semifinals

33rd place

35th place

37th place

39th place

References

External links
Official website

Men's team